Popondetta (sometimes spelled Popondota) is the capital of Oro (Northern) Province in Papua New Guinea. Popondetta is a city.

In 1951 the city became the focus of relief efforts after nearby Mount Lamington erupted and killed 4,000 people.

Popondetta is near to Buna on the Northern Papua coast and is not far from the beginning of the Kokoda Trail, made famous during World War II.

This area of New Guinea is home to the endangered Queen Alexandra's birdwing, the world's largest butterfly.

Climate
Popondetta has a tropical rainforest climate (Köppen Af) with heavy rainfall year-round.

Education
Newton Theological College is located in Popondetta.

References

Populated places in Oro Province
Provincial capitals in Papua New Guinea